Abolqassem Aref Qazvini (1882  – January 21, 1934) was an Iranian poet, lyricist, and musician.

Biography
He was born in Qazvin.

He composed many poems about Iran and was called a national poet. Along with his powerful poetry, he also wrote lyrics for numerous songs and played music. He was a revolutionary during the Iranian Constitutional Revolution and made many political and pro-revolutionary songs. He moved to Hamadan later in his life and died there in January 1934 at the age of 52.

After his death his complete works were published in Berlin and Tehran.

One of his poems is called "- ناله مرغ اسیر" (imprisoned bird's moaning)" in which he invites his fellows to fight for their freedom in the first sixth verses. He believes that their country is not supposed to be developed by the help of foreigners. Instead, he believes that people should sacrifice their lives in order to protect and save their country. In the end, he states that the Shah, who has been assigned as the most influential person is actually the people's enemy. 
He wrote this poem during the Constitutional period affected by the patriotic feelings and the love to Iran. The anti- colonial attitudes and nationalist beliefs which were becoming widespread at the time was the source of inspiration for the poet. Iran was moving towards modernity and worldwide culture, but intellectuals did not want to be dependent on Russia and England.
Birds are the symbol of freedom, the image of a caged chicken represents the state of liberal people who could not express themselves freely at the time of the poem. By using this image, the poet tries to inform his countrymen not to stay silent; otherwise, they would become depressed and hopeless like the caged birds. Another image is "wind" which is the symbol of liberty in Persian literature, and is used as a hopeful sign to spread the message of freedom. Furthermore, the wind blows at all the people without exception which shows the necessity of all Iranians' contribution to save the country. These images, which are the intrinsic elements of this poem, are set to question the bourgeoisie system; this text as a social institution denies the ruling class ideology, because the poem addresses the fellow countrymen, intending to empower this group to fight the authorities.

External links

 J. Matīnī, M. Caton, ʿĀref Qazvīnī / Encyclopædia Iranica (1986—2011).
 Abolqassem Aref Ghazvini, Rouhollah Khaleghi Artistic Center / Kanun-e  Honari-e Rouhollah Khaleghi

1882 births
1934 deaths
People from Qazvin
20th-century Iranian poets
Persian-language poets
Iranian lyricists
People of the Persian Constitutional Revolution
19th-century Iranian poets